The 2015 Rushcliffe Borough Council election took place on 7 May 2015 to elect members of the Rushcliffe Borough Council in England. It was held on the same day as other local elections.

Overall election results

Rushcliffe Borough Council (Summary of Overall Results)

Rushcliffe Borough Council - Results by Ward

Abbey

Bingham East

Bingham West

Bunny

Compton Acres

Cotgrave

Cranmer

Cropwell

East Bridgford

Edwalton

Gamston North

Gamston South

Gotham

Keyworth and Wolds

Lady Bay

Leake

Lutterell

Musters

Nevile

Radcliffe On Trent

Ruddington

Stanford

Tollerton

Trent Bridge

References

2015 English local elections
May 2015 events in the United Kingdom
2015
2010s in Nottinghamshire